The 2009 GT4 European Cup season was the third season of the GT4 European Cup. It began on May 3 at Silverstone, before finishing on September 13 at Portimao after twelve races.

Entry list

Championship standings

GT4

Supersport

External links
 Official Website of the GT4 European Cup

GT4 European Series
2009 in European sport
GT4 European Cup